Edward Haydn Higgins (February 21, 1932 – August 31, 2009) was an American jazz pianist, composer, and orchestrator.  His performance and composition in 1959's "Cry of Jazz" is preserved in the Library of Congress' National Film Registry.

Biography
Born and raised in Cambridge, Massachusetts, United States, Higgins initially studied privately with his mother. He started his professional career in Chicago, Illinois, while studying at the Northwestern University School of Music and earned a spot in fellow Northwestern alumnus Paul Severson's band in 1956 before leading his own band in 1957. 

For more than two decades Higgins worked at some of Chicago's most prestigious jazz clubs, including the Brass Rail, Preview Lounge, Blue Note, Cloister Inn and Jazz, Ltd. His longest and most memorable tenure was at the long-gone London House, where he led his jazz trio from 1957 to the late 1960s, playing opposite jazz stars of this period, including Cannonball Adderley, Bill Evans, Erroll Garner, Stan Getz, Dizzy Gillespie, Wes Montgomery, Oscar Peterson and George Shearing, among others. Later, Higgins said the opportunities to play jazz music with Coleman Hawkins and Oscar Peterson were unforgettable moments. Higgins spent his time at the London House Restaurant with bassist Richard Evans and drummer Marshall Thompson. Higgins also worked for Chess Records as a producer.

During his stay in Chicago, Higgins also recorded a significant number of albums under his auspices and many more as a sideman with a wide variety of musicians, ranging in style from tenor saxophonists Hawkins to Sonny Stitt to Wayne Shorter; trumpeters Bobby Lewis to Harry Edison to Lee Morgan and Freddie Hubbard; and trombonists Jack Teagarden to Al Grey. His versatility was captured on stage and records, backing up singers and leading his own projects as both pianist and orchestrator, working in every jazz circle from dixieland to modal styles.  Although he opted to decline the offer, Higgins was asked at one point by  Art Blakey  to join the seminal hard bop quintet, The Jazz Messengers.

In 1970, Higgins moved to Fort Lauderdale, Florida and began spending winters in Florida and summers on Cape Cod, where he played in local clubs. Since the early 1980s, he traveled widely on the jazz festival circuit and performed frequently in Europe and Japan. His releases on the Japanese Venus label earned him number one in jazz sales on more than one album. After that, Higgins played his music mainly in East Asia including Japan and South Korea. During his career in East Asia, Higgins formed a successful trio with Joe Ascione (drums), and Jay Leonhart (bass).
In 1988, Higgins and jazz singer and pianist Meredith d'Ambrosio were married and became a popular team at clubs and festivals, as well as recording for Sunnyside Records.

In 2009, dates in Japan and Korea were on his calendar of upcoming concerts, but were suspended due to a long illness.

Higgins died on August 31, 2009 of lung and lymphatic cancer in Fort Lauderdale at the age of 77.

Style
Eddie Higgins's delicate tone and conception were often compared to those of Bill Evans, one of the most influential and successful jazz pianists. He mostly played bop and mainstream jazz music throughout his career. Higgins was at home playing melodies with swing-like feeling. His melodies had groove and swing-feeling without being superfluous. Such swing-feeling of Eddie Higgins was also often compared to those of Oscar Peterson and Nat King Cole.

Accomplishment
In 2009, Eddie Higgins received Jazz Disc Award from the most respected jazz magazine in Japan, Swing Journal. With his album, Portraits of Love, Higgins won the Best Album of the Year. In the same year, Higgins received another award from Best Engineering Album of the Year.

Discography

As leader

Source:

Compilations
Relaxin' at the Lounge (Venus)
Standard Higgins (Venus)
Ballad Higgins (Venus)
Tenderly: The Best of Eddie Higgins (Venus)

Source:

As sideman
With Paul Severson

 1957  Jazz (Replica)
 1957  Misty Island/Please Love Me (Altair)

With Meredith d'Ambrosio
 1989 South to a Warmer Place
 1991 Love Is Not a Game
 1993 Shadowland
 1995 Beware of Spring!
 2001 Love Is for the Birds

With Wayne Shorter
 1962 Wayning Moments
 2002 All or Nothing at All 
 2013 Beginnings

With Lee Morgan
 1960 Expoobident
 2002 Just in Time

With Sonny Stitt
 2000 Sonny, Sweets, and Jaws: Live at Bubba's 
 2001 No Greater Love
 2004 Just Friends: Live at Bubba's Jazz Restaurant 1981

With Warren Vaché
 1999 Mrs. Vache's Boys 
 2007 Remember

With Chuck Hedges
 1992 No Greater Love
 2001 Just for Fun

With others
 1957 This Is Lucy Reed, Lucy Reed
 1959 Touff Assignment, Cy Touff
 1961 Brilliant, Don Goldie
 1961 The Thinking Man’s Trombone  Al Grey
 1963 Sextet in Person, Jack Teagarden
 1985 The Great Fontana, Carl Fontana
 1992 The Wonderful World of George Gershwin, George Masso
 1996 A Time for Love, John Doughten
 1996 Stolen Goods, Betty Dickson
 1997 Double Rainbow, Rebecca Parris
 1999 Great Duets, Jay Leonhart
 2001 Indian Summer, Greg Fishman
 2005 Hot & Blue Vol. 1–2, Bill Allred
 2016 One Night in Indy, Wes Montgomery

Source:

References

External links
 Biography by Higgins's friend, Bill Gallagher
 Obituary in Chicago Tribune

1932 births
2009 deaths
American jazz pianists
American male pianists
American jazz bandleaders
Bienen School of Music alumni
Musicians from Cambridge, Massachusetts
Musicians from Chicago
Deaths from pancreatic cancer
Vee-Jay Records artists
Atlantic Records artists
20th-century American pianists
Jazz musicians from Massachusetts
Jazz musicians from Illinois
20th-century American male musicians
American male jazz musicians
Sunnyside Records artists